Liliana Mele (born 1984 in Gondar, Ethiopia) is an Italian-Ethiopian actress and model.

Biography 
Born in Gondar to Italian-Ethiopian family, arrives in Italy at the age of six and then moves back to Ethiopia, with all his family, at the age of fourteen. She attended the Airbag third millennium theater workshop of the Italian cultural institute for three years. In 2000 she won the pre-selection of Miss Italia nel Mondo obtaining the title of Miss Ethiopia which allows her to return to Italy, for the final of the competition, where she ranks in fourth place.

She made her film debut in 2004 on the set of Carlo Verdone in  Love Is Eternal While It Lasts . In 2005 she played the role of Amina, one of the protagonists of the television series Gente di mare broadcast on Rai 1 for two seasons. At the same time he is part of the regular cast of the television series Roma, an international drama consisting of two seasons.

In 2009 she starred alongside Sergio Castellitto and Riccardo Scamarcio in an episode of the film Italians directed by Giovanni Veronesi. In 2011 she plays the role of Sinan in  The wonderful adventure of Antonio Franconi  by Luca Verdone, with Massimo Ranieri and Sonia Aquino. Between 2012 and 2015 she played various roles in various television episodes
including Distretto di Polizia, The Captain, Laura's Choice, Red Valentine's Day, For the love of my people and Don Matteo 10.

She subsequently devoted a period of time to study, graduating in performing arts and sciences and earning a master's degree in Los Angeles at the prestigious acting school Lee Strasberg Theatre and Film Institute.
In 2017 he worked alongside Giuseppe Fiorello, Corrado Fortuna and Daniela Marra in the film All the world is a country directed by Giulio Manfredonia. In 2021 she is part of the cast of the series Mare fuori broadcast on Rai 2 playing the role of Latifah.

Filmography

Cinema 
 Love is eternal while it lasts, directed by Carlo Verdone (2004)
 Italians, directed by Giovanni Veronesi (2008)
 On & Off, directed by Mario Marasco (2009)
 The wonderful adventure of Antonio Franconi, directed by Luca Verdone (2011)
 Everything, nothing, nothing, directed by Giulio Manfredonia (2012)

Television 
 District of Police (fifth season), directed by Lucio Gaudino (2005)
 Roma, directed by Steve Hill (2005)
 Seafarers (seasons 1-2), directed by Alfredo Peyretti, Vittorio De Sisti, Franco Angeli (2005-2007)
 Roma (second season), directed by Steve Hill (2007)
 The Captain (second season), directed by Vittorio Sindoni (2008)
 Laura's choice, directed by Alessandro Piva (2009)
 Rosso San Valentino, directed by Fabrizio Costa (2012)
 For the love of my people, directed by Antonio Frazzi (2013)
 Don Matteo (tenth season), directed by Monica Vullo (2015)
 All the world is a country, directed by Giulio Manfredonia (2018)
 L'isola di Pietro (second season), directed by Luca Brignone and Giulio Manfredonia (2018)
 Mare fuori (second season), directed by Milena Cocozza and Ivan Silvestrini, 3 episodes (2021)
 Mare fuori (third season), directed by Ivan Silvestrini, 6 episodes (2023)

Shorts 
 What good boys, directed by Hedy Krissane (2012)
 Wake up, directed by Evaristus Ogbechie (2018)

Advertising 
 Telecom Gandhi Speech directed by Spike Lee and Alessandro D'Alatri (2008)
 Advertising campaign for Monte dei Paschi di Siena (2011)
 Advertisement Fao (2012)
 Vraylar America, directed by M. Haussman
 Super Dry Beer Japan (2019)

Dubbing 
 Bakhita. The African saint, directed by Giacomo Campiotti (2008)
 Black and white, directed by Francesca Comencini (2008)

Video clips 
 I can't resist by Irene Grandi, (2005)
 Mun up by Cosma Brussani, (2012)

Theater 
 Love, directed by Leonardo Ferrari Dearest (2013)
 Cleopatra, directed by Johannes Bramante (2015)
 I don't know, you know, what do they know?, directed by Vito Ostuni (2016)
 Nero Cuore, directed by Giorgio Crisafi (2019)

Acknowledgments
 Youth Oscar – delivered in the Campidoglio (2007)

References

External links 

 

1984 births
20th-century Italian actresses
21st-century Italian actresses
Italian stage actresses
People from Gondar
Italian people of Ethiopian descent
Italian film actresses
Italian models
Italian voice actresses
Italian expatriates in Ethiopia
Ethiopian people of Italian descent
Living people